Abu Hatim Ṭayyib Ziyā'u d-Dīn (August 6, 1932 – May 23, 2015), full name Saiyedna Abu Haatim Taiyeb Ziyauddin Saheb and personal name Taiyyeb, Ayyubali with kunya (agnomen) "Abu Haatim", was the 44th Dā‘ī al-Muṭlaq, "the absolute or unrestricted missionary", of the Alavi Bohra, a minority group of Ismā‘īlī Shī‘ah Muslims. Since he assumed the position in 1974, the Alavi Bohra community has progressed both locally and internationally in education, economic prosperity, religion, and in the awareness among its youth of the group's identity and religious roots.

Saiyedna saheb was born in 1932 to Saiyedna Yusuf Nuruddin Saheb (a.q.), the 43rd Da'i-e-Mutlaq, and Marhooma Maa Saheba Khadeejat ul-Kubra Mithibu binte Rajabali, and became Alavi Bohra's Da'i al-Mutlaq in 1974. His teacher was the 42nd Da'i-e-Mutlaq Saiyedna Fida'ali Badruddin Saheb. In 1975 (1395 AH), Abu Haatim performed the Hajj with 27 followers, the same number that was present with Sy. Shamsuddin Ali bin Ibrahim Shaheed (a.q.) in Ahmedabad during the mutiny by the usurper of Ahl-e-Motaghallib. He performed the Hajj again in 1992 (1412 AH), making him the only Da'i to date who has performed the Hajj twice. Throughout 2000, he visited Karbala, Shaam, Najaf, Kufa, Bait ul-Muqaddas, Cairo, and Yemen in a comprehensive tour, making him the first Mansoor ul-Yamane and Zaair il-Mashhadain il-'Azeemain to do so. Additionally, despite health problems, Abu Haatim, accompanied by Karam-e-Rehmani and Roohani Taaeed from Imam uz-Zamaan, accomplished the Taiyebi Daur, the most difficult portion of safar-e-mubaarak, successfully.

On December 27, 1984, at Masjid-e-Noorani, Abu Haatim appointed Mazoon ud-Da'wat and Mansoos ud-Da'wat, the eldest son of Abu Haatim, at the fourth Rabi-ul-Aakhar. Abu Haatim's name Ṭayyib is derived from the name of the 21st Imam, Ṭayyib, who went into seclusion in 1130 as a result of the tyranny and oppression imposed by the other communities in Cairo when he was four years old. Abu Haatim lives in Daar us-Salaam, Vadodara. On May 23, 2015 Syedna Abu Hatim Tayyib Ziyauddin saheb died peacefully in Vadodara, Gujarat, India. He was succeeded in the post of Dai al Mutlaq by Saiyedna Abu Sa'eed il-Khayr Haatim Zakiyuddin saheb (tus) as the 45th Dai al Mutlaq of the Alavi Bohra.

References

Indian Ismailis
Alavi Bohra da'is
Alavi Bohras
Ismaili theology
1932 births
2015 deaths